The Cardston Alberta Temple (formerly the Alberta Temple) is the eighth constructed and sixth of the still-operating temples of the Church of Jesus Christ of Latter-day Saints. Located in Cardston, Alberta, it is the church's oldest temple outside the United States. It is one of eight temples that does not have an angel Moroni statue, and one of six without spires, similar to Solomon's Temple.  It is also one of only two temples the church built in the shape of a cross, the other being the Laie Hawaii Temple.

History 
The temple was announced on June 27, 1913, and was built on Temple Hill, an eight-acre plot given to the church by Charles Ora Card. The granite used in building the temple was hand-hewn from quarries in Nelson, British Columbia.

Originally dedicated on August 26, 1923, by church president Heber J. Grant, an addition was rededicated on July 2, 1962, by Hugh B. Brown.  The first temple president was Edward J. Wood, who served from 1923 to 1948. The temple was renovated in the 1990s, and Gordon B. Hinckley rededicated it on June 22, 1991.

In 1992, the temple was declared a National Historic Site, and a plaque was dedicated in 1995.

In 2020, like all the church's other temples, the Cardston Alberta Temple was closed in response to the coronavirus pandemic.

Presidents or matrons 
Other than Wood, other notable temple presidents, or matrons, include Merlin R. Lybbert (1994–97); Elaine L. Jack (1997–2000); and Ardeth G. Kapp (2000–03).

See also 

 Comparison of temples of The Church of Jesus Christ of Latter-day Saints
 Torleif S. Knaphus — sculpted the large bas relief titled Christ the Fountainhead on the exterior of the building and also the life-size oxen holding the baptism font 
 LeConte Stewart - painted murals and other art work in the temple
 List of National Historic Sites of Canada in Alberta
 List of temples of The Church of Jesus Christ of Latter-day Saints
 List of temples of The Church of Jesus Christ of Latter-day Saints by geographic region
 Temple architecture (Latter-day Saints)
 The Church of Jesus Christ of Latter-day Saints in Canada

References

Further reading 
 
 
 
 
  (Has accompanying color photographs of interior of Cardston Alberta Temple)

External links 

Cardston Alberta Temple Official site
Cardston Alberta Temple at ChurchofJesusChristTemples.org
 

1923 establishments in Alberta
20th-century Latter Day Saint temples
Buildings designed to replicate Solomon's Temple
Cardston
National Historic Sites in Alberta
Religious buildings and structures on the National Historic Sites of Canada register
Churches completed in 1923
Temples (LDS Church) in Alberta
Buildings and structures in Cardston County
20th-century religious buildings and structures in Canada